Craig Richard Nelson (born September 17, 1947) is an American actor in theater, film and television.

Life and career 
Nelson was born in Salt Lake City, Utah, and grew up as a member of the Church of Jesus Christ of Latter-day Saints. He studied acting at the University of Utah and New York University's Tisch School of the Arts. After graduation, he was cast in the Tony Award-winning Broadway musical Two Gentlemen of Verona.

A casting director saw him in that show and cast him in the film The Paper Chase as a mean-spirited law student. This led to a long career in film and television, including three Robert Altman films, A Wedding, 3 Women, and Quintet as well as a role in the coming-of-age comedy My Bodyguard. He also had a recurring role as drama teacher Mr. Spacek on the 1980s television show Square Pegs.

Filmography

Film
The Paper Chase (1973) – Bell
3 Women (1977) – Dr. Maas
A Wedding (1978) – Reedley Roots
Quintet (1979) – Redstone
My Bodyguard (1980) – Griffith
A Small Circle of Friends (1980) – Harry Norris
Honey, I Shrunk the Kids (1989) – Professor Fredrickson (uncredited)
Another You (1991) – Walt

Television
Paul Sand in Friends and Lovers (1974) – Mason Woodruff
Fernwood 2 Night (1977) – Dr. Richard Osgood
Maude (1977) – Guest Star
Stick Around (TV pilot)(1977) - Earl
The Grass is Always Greener over the Septic Tank (1978) – Hal Watson
Barney Miller (1978) - Arnold Moraz
Carol Burnett & Company (1979) – Regular
Square Pegs (1982) – Mr. Spacek
The Golden Girls   (1986) – Mr. Thurber  (1 episode)
L.A. Law (1988) – U.S. Attorney Donald Kelly (uncredited)
Dream On (1990) - Andre
Star Trek: The Next Generation (1990) – Krag
Alien Nation (1989) – Attorney
Get a Life (1990) – Hastings
Home Improvement (1991) – Bjorn
Diagnosis: Murder (1993) - Dr. Thatcher
Murder, She Wrote (1995) - Rob Hazlitt
Star Trek: Voyager (1998) – Vaskan arbiter

References

External links

1947 births
Living people
Male actors from Salt Lake City
American male stage actors
American male film actors
American male television actors
University of Utah alumni
Tisch School of the Arts alumni
20th-century American male actors
American Latter Day Saints